Gregory Cahill is an American director, producer, and screenwriter known for The Golden Voice and Two Shadows.  He is also the production coordinator for The Talk and assistant directed Hell and Back.  He won the Audience Award at the Los Angeles Asian Pacific Film Festival for his film Two Shadows and is currently working on his upcoming film Metalheads.  Cahill has his own production company, Rising Falcon Cinema, as well.

Early life 
Cahill grew up in Boston, Massachusetts.  He is also a graduate of the Tisch School of the Arts.

Career
In an interview for Cahill's film Two Shadows, he discussed how The Golden Voice led him to the film.  "I was really taken with that music and got really interested in one the singers, this female Cambodian rock singer named Ros Sereysothea. I read that she was murdered by the Khmer Rouge. And that all the musicians from that time were murdered by the Khmer Rouge. So that’s when I thought [that] there must have been quite a story behind that. So I researched that and made a short film about that singer…called The Golden Voice. Then in doing research to develop that into a feature, I went to Cambodia a few times, really fell in love with the country, and started hearing peoples’ stories there. That's what led to Two Shadows, which is based on a friend of mine's real-life story."

Filmography

Awards and nominations

References

External links
 

Living people
1982 births
Writers from Boston
Businesspeople from Massachusetts
Businesspeople from Los Angeles
21st-century American businesspeople
21st-century American male actors
21st-century American writers
American male screenwriters
American male film actors
American film editors
Male actors from Boston
Male actors from Los Angeles
Boston College High School alumni
Tisch School of the Arts alumni
Film directors from Los Angeles
Screenwriters from California
Screenwriters from Massachusetts